West Salem is a neighborhood in Salem, Oregon, United States, located in the far northwest part of the city. West Salem is the only part of the city that is located in Polk County. The neighborhood is separated from the rest of Salem by the Willamette River, which serves as West Salem's southeast border. The business districts of West Salem are located on Edgewater Street and Wallace Road.  , the portion of Salem within Polk County had a population of 24,183.

History
In 1889 a plat for West Salem was filed, and the city incorporated in 1913. In 1949, the city was officially merged with Salem. West Salem post office was established in 1938 and ran until 1952. The former West Salem City Hall (now housing private offices) was placed on the National Register of Historic Places in 1990.

Education
West Salem is served by the Salem-Keizer School District, which includes West Salem High School, Walker Middle School,  Straub Middle School, Brush College, Myers, Harritt, Chapman Hill, and Kalapuya elementary schools. Straub Middle School and Kalapuya Elementary School opened in the fall of 2011, and were funded by the Salem-Keizer School District construction bond.

Transportation
The neighborhood is connected to the rest of Salem by the Marion Street Bridge and Center Street Bridge that carry Oregon Route 22 over the Willamette River. The Union Street Railroad Bridge also crosses the Willamette, but carries pedestrians and bicycles instead of trains. Oregon 22 and Oregon Route 221 (Wallace Road) are the two state highways in West Salem.

References

External links

West Salem history from Salem Public Library
Salem Neighborhoods
Map

Neighborhoods in Salem, Oregon
Former cities in Oregon
1889 establishments in Oregon
Populated places established in 1889
1949 disestablishments in Oregon
1913 establishments in Oregon
Populated places on the Willamette River